George Crile may refer to: 

 George Washington Crile (1864–1943), American surgeon
 George Crile Jr. (1907–1992), American surgeon
 George Crile III (1945–2006), American journalist